The Amyand, later Cornewall Baronetcy of Moccas Court, in the County of Hereford, was created in the Baronetage of Great Britain on 9 August 1764 for George Amyand, who was a Member of Parliament (MP) for Barnstaple in the House of Commons of Great Britain.

Amyand, later Cornewall baronets, of Moccas Court (1764)

Sir George Amyand, 1st Baronet (1720–1766)
Sir George Cornewall, 2nd Baronet (1748–1819): assumed the surname and arms of "Cornewall" by royal licence in 1771
Sir George Cornewall, 3rd Baronet (1774–1835)
Sir Velters Cornewall, 4th Baronet (1824–1868)
Sir George Henry Cornewall, 5th Baronet (1833–1908)
Sir Geoffrey Cornewall, 6th Baronet (1869–1951)
Sir William Francis Cornewall, 7th Baronet (1871–1962)

References

Extinct baronetcies in the Baronetage of Great Britain